Ramón Díaz may refer to:
 Ramón Díaz (born 1959), Argentine footballer and coach
 Ramón Díaz (1926-2017), Uruguayan lawyer, economist and journalist
 José Ramón Díaz Alejandro (born 1943), Cuban painter and writer